Swan was a United States test nuclear explosive, which was developed into the XW-45 warhead.

It was tested standalone on June 22, 1956, in shot Redwing Inca. It was tested again as the primary of a thermonuclear device on July 2, 1956, in shot Redwing Mohawk. Both tests were successful.

Design features 
The Swan device is the first design to incorporate a two-point ignition hollow-pit air-lens implosion assembly together with fusion boosting.

The above schematic illustrates what were probably its essential features.

References 

Nuclear bombs of the United States